Bruno Sang Gissoni (born 9 December 1986) is a Brazilian actor.

Biography 

Born in Rio de Janeiro, Bruno lived for eight years in Los Angeles, United States. In Los Angeles he attended Venice High School. Back in Brazil, he played professional soccer for São Paulo FC and Nova Iguaçu Futebol Clube.

In 2007, he made a cameo in the novel Alta Estação, the Rede Record. He debuted in theater in 2009, with the number Capitães de Areia, based on literary works of Jorge Amado, and soon after, joined the Actors School Rede Record, given by actor Roberto Bomtempo.

The same year he also joined the cast of the play Os Melhores anos de nossas vidas. In 2010, he had his first role in television, when it pioneered the tenth to eighth season of Malhação. In 2011 works in the series Julie e os Fantasmas, exhibited by Rede Bandeirantes, in 2012, he joined the cast of the telenovela Avenida Brasil, Rede Globo.

In 2013, the telenovela is the Flor do Caribe, playing the fisherman Juliano.

Personal life 

Bruno is the son of Ana Paula Sang producer and stepson of capoeirista Beto Simas, and is also the brother of actor Rodrigo Simas, with whom he served in Capitães de Areia and Os Melhores anos de nossas vidas, and the football player Felipe Simas.
He married actress Yanna Lavigne in 2018 after being in a relationship since 2013.
In 2017, they welcomed a daughter, Madalena.

Filmography

Television

Theater

References

External links 

1986 births
Living people
Male actors from Rio de Janeiro (city)
Brazilian people of Italian descent
Brazilian male television actors
Brazilian male telenovela actors
Brazilian male film actors
Brazilian male stage actors
Brazilian emigrants to the United States